Sir David Ernest Thomas Floyd Ewin    (17 February 1911 – 11 November 2003) was a British administrator and Trustee of St Paul's Cathedral.

Registered at birth as Ernest Thomas Floyd Ewin, he was the youngest of ten children of Frederick Philip Ewin and his wife Ellen Floyd. He later adopted the name of David.

Ewin served as Registrar and Receiver of St Paul's from 1944 to 1978, when he formally retired, but continued to work for the cathedral as a volunteer.

In 1948, in Totnes, Devon, Ewin married Marion Lewis. They had one son and one daughter.

A freeman of London, in 1959 he served as Master of the Guild of Freemen of the City of London.

In 1965, Ewin organized the state funeral of Winston Churchill. He was appointed an Officer of the Order of the British Empire later in the year and was knighted in the 1974 Birthday Honours.

In the 1990s, Ewin was a Deputy in the Castle Baynard ward of the City of London Corporation.

He retired to Torbay, where he died. His obituary in The Daily Telegraph says of him that he "gave virtually the whole of his working life – and many years of his retirement – to the service of St Paul's Cathedral."

Publications
 David Floyd Ewin, The Splendour of St Paul's (Norwich: Jarrold, 1973)

Notes

1911 births
2003 deaths
Knights Bachelor
Officers of the Order of the British Empire